Oliver Duff may refer to:
Oliver Duff (New Zealand editor) (1883–1967), New Zealand writer and editor
Oliver Duff (British editor) (born 1983), British journalist and newspaper editor

See also
Oliver Duff Greene (1833–1904), American Union Army officer